The Grand Hotel, Qazvin was a hotel built in 1922 in Qazvin, Iran constructed in the Pahlavi era under the governorship of Sa'd as-Saltaneh. It was built in the western wing of Chehel Sotun Palace, by the well-known architect of Qazvin, Ostad (Master) Ali July. 

This building is one of the oldest remaining hotels in whole country. According to the travelers who have personally resided in the hotel and based on the itineraries, all the furniture and appliances of the hotel have had a European style and interior decoration have been fully luxurious. According to the history, Grand Hotel has been a place of political incidents such as Reza Shah’s coup d’etat plan.

References 

Hotels in Iran
Buildings and structures in Qazvin Province
Hotels established in 1922
Hotel buildings completed in 1922